Paul Bottomley pioneered the development of magnetic resonance imaging (MRI) leading to modern commercial clinical 1.5 Tesla MRI scanners and techniques for localized magnetic resonance spectroscopy (MRS). Currently, he is Russel H. Morgan Professor of Radiology and Director of the Division of MR Research at Johns Hopkins University, with about 200 peer-reviewed journal articles, over 50 U.S patents and is a Founder and past member of the Board of Directors of ClearPoint Neuro Inc, formerly known as MRI Interventions Inc and SurgiVision Inc, a Johns Hopkins start-up.

Work
Born in Melbourne, Australia, Bottomley earned a BSc in physics from Monash University in 1974. In 1975, he started a PhD in physics at the University of Nottingham in one of the three original groups that began MRI. In Raymond Andrew's group, alongside that of Peter Mansfield, they built the first MRI system producing radiographic-quality images of the human wrist (Nature), and performed the initial work on RF-field and power deposition in human MRI. Upon completing his PhD, he went to Johns Hopkins University in Baltimore in 1978 to adapt MRI for spatially localized MRS, using surface coils to demonstrate metabolite depletion and reversal in regional myocardial ischemia (Science).

In 1980, Paul joined the GE Research Center in Schenectady NY. Together with William A. Edelstein and others, this group formed the nucleus of GE's early MRI development program. They ordered the biggest magnet available – a 1.5 Tesla system – and built the first high-field whole-body MRI/MRS scanner, overcoming problems of coil design, RF penetration and signal-to-noise. The results translated into the highly successful 1.5 Tesla clinical MRI products of which there are well over 20,000 systems today, representing 60-70% of all systems. Paul did the first localized MRS in human heart and brain. After starting a collaboration on heart applications with Robert Weiss at Johns Hopkins, Paul returned to Johns Hopkins University in 1994, as Professor and Director of the MR Research Division. He works on the application of MRS to measure cardiac energy metabolism in the healthy and failing heart, and the development of interventional MRI technology. He has about 200 peer-reviewed papers with most-cited reviews of tissue relaxation in Medical Physics, the 'Handbook of Magnetic Resonance Spectroscopy in vivo' (ISBN 978-1-118-99766-6) and over 50 patents, including high-field MRI (>0.7 Tesla), spin-echo MRI, ‘crusher’ gradients, 'fat-saturation', '3D-slab' MRI, and 'point resolved spectroscopy' (PRESS), 2D spatially-selective pulses, MRI-safe implantable leads (licensed and sold as Avista™ by Boston Scientific Inc), and 'MRI endoscopy'. He is a Fellow and 1989 Gold Medal recipient of the International Society of Magnetic Resonance in Medicine, a GE gold patent and GE Coolidge Fellowship awardee, the 2015 Gold Medal recipient of the American Roentgen-Ray Society and the 2018-2019 Newton Abraham Visiting Professor at Oxford University U.K.

Awards
Gold Medal of the Society for Magnetic Resonance in Medicine (1989)
GE Coolidge Fellow and Medal, (1990)
GE Gold (1989), Silver (1985) and Bronze (1982) patent medallions
Editors recognition awards from Radiology (1986, 1988, 1989, 1990)
GE Dushman Award (1983)
Associate editor, Magn Reson Med (1983-2004), deputy editor (2010-present) 
Editorial boards of Magn Reson Imag (1982–present), Rev Sci Instrum (1986-1988), and Radiology (1991-5)
Editorial board of Advanced Medicine (Japan: 1995–); MAGMA (2003–2006)
Elected trustee, Soc Magn Reson Med (1986-1989), and Soc Magn Reson Imag (1982-1986)
Fellow, Soc Magn Reson (1989)
Gold Medal of the American Roentgen Ray Society (2015)
Distinguished investigator, Academy of Radiology Research (2012)
Member, National Academy of Inventors (2015)
Soc Magn Reson Med Sir Peter Mansfield Lecturer (2012)
NIH grant reviewer since 1979

References

1954 births
Living people
Magnetic resonance imaging
21st-century American chemists
Australian chemists